RaNae Jean Bair (March 9, 1943 – January 23, 2021) was a javelin thrower from the United States who represented her native country twice at the Summer Olympics: 1964 and 1968. Born in San Diego, California and affiliated with the San Diego State University, she set her personal best (59.82 metres) in 1967. She later married UCLA distance runner (an Olympic hopeful himself) Bob Seaman, who has gone on to be an award-winning USATF official and administrator.

International competitions

References

RaNae Bair's obituary

1943 births
2021 deaths
American female javelin throwers
Athletes (track and field) at the 1963 Pan American Games
Athletes (track and field) at the 1964 Summer Olympics
Athletes (track and field) at the 1967 Pan American Games
Athletes (track and field) at the 1968 Summer Olympics
Olympic track and field athletes of the United States
San Diego State Aztecs women's track and field athletes
Pan American Games medalists in athletics (track and field)
Track and field athletes from San Diego
Pan American Games silver medalists for the United States
Universiade medalists in athletics (track and field)
Universiade gold medalists for the United States
Medalists at the 1967 Summer Universiade
Medalists at the 1967 Pan American Games